Wesley Bryan (born March 26, 1990) is an American professional golfer who plays on the Korn Ferry Tour.

Early life
Bryan attended Dutch Fork High School in Irmo, South Carolina. He played college golf at the University of South Carolina, winning two events.

Professional career
Bryan played on mini-tours before earning his Web.com Tour card for 2016 by finishing T-9 at qualifying school. In his third event of the 2016 season, he won the Chitimacha Louisiana Open. 

He picked up a second win a month later at the El Bosque Mexico Championship. In August, he won his third event of the season, the Digital Ally Open, to earn promotion to the PGA Tour. He was the eleventh golfer to do so. He won the Web.com Tour Player of the Year award.

On April 16, 2017, Bryan secured his first PGA Tour victory at the RBC Heritage and earned a spot at the 2018 Masters Tournament. He won by a single stroke over Luke Donald, after a final round of 67 moved him through the field from four strokes behind. With the win, Bryan moved up to 37th in the Official World Golf Ranking, his career-best ranking to date.

Other activities
Bryan and his brother George started a YouTube channel featuring their golf trick-shot videos. They also appeared on the golf reality show Big Break The Palm Beaches, FL in 2015. George caddied for Wesley for his first Web.com Tour win. George is also a professional golfer, playing the 2017 season on the PGA Tour Latinoamérica.

Bryan and his wife Elizabeth have two daughters, Hadley and Winnie.

Amateur wins (2)
 2008 Rees Jones Intercollegiate
 2012 Seahawk Intercollegiate

Source:

Professional wins (4)

PGA Tour wins (1)

Web.com Tour wins (3)

Web.com Tour playoff record (1–0)

Results in major championships

CUT = missed the half-way cut
"T" = tied

Results in The Players Championship

CUT = missed the halfway cut

Results in World Golf Championships

"T" = tied

See also
 2016 Web.com Tour Finals graduates
 List of golfers to achieve a three-win promotion from the Web.com Tour

References

External links
 
 
 

American male golfers
South Carolina Gamecocks men's golfers
PGA Tour golfers
Korn Ferry Tour graduates
Golfers from South Carolina
Sportspeople from Columbia, South Carolina
1990 births
Living people